Andrei Radzionau (born June 16, 1985) is a Belarusian swimmer, who specialized in sprint freestyle events. Radzionau was also a varsity swimmer for the Louisville Cardinals, who graduated with a bachelor of arts in environmental analysis from University of Louisville in Louisville, Kentucky.

Radzionau qualified for the men's 50 m freestyle at the 2008 Summer Olympics in Beijing, by establishing a new Belarusian record and clearing a FINA B-standard entry time of 22.72 from the national championships in his hometown Minsk. He challenged seven other swimmers on the ninth heat, including three-time Olympian Camilo Becerra of Colombia. Radzionau edged out Filipino-American tanker and Florida-based resident Daniel Coakley to take the fifth spot by four hundredths of a second (0.04), posting his personal best of 22.65. Radzionau placed twenty-sixth out of 97 swimmers in the preliminaries.

References

External links
Player Bio – Louisville Cardinals
NBC Olympics Profile

1985 births
Living people
Belarusian male freestyle swimmers
Olympic swimmers of Belarus
Swimmers at the 2008 Summer Olympics
Sportspeople from Minsk
Louisville Cardinals men's swimmers